The Blueprint Culture and Creative Park (BCP) is a multi-purpose park in South District, Tainan, Taiwan.

History
The park was opened in December 2015.

Architecture
The park was built from old abandoned judicial houses which have been restored with blueprint architectural style. The park includes restaurants.

See also
 List of tourist attractions in Taiwan

References

External links

 

2015 establishments in Taiwan
Art centers in Tainan
Cultural centers in Tainan